Campbelltown City or the City of Campbelltown may refer to:

 Campbelltown City SC, association football club in South Australia
 City of Campbelltown (New South Wales), a local government area in Sydney, New South Wales, Australia
 City of Campbelltown (South Australia), a local government area in Adelaide, South Australia